Amon Ritter von Gregurich (26 May 1867 – 28 June 1915) was a Hungarian fencer. He competed in the individual sabre event at the 1900 Summer Olympics. He was a student of the famous fencing reformer Luigi Barbasetti and was killed in action during World War I.

See also
 List of Olympians killed in World War I

References

External links
 

1867 births
1915 deaths
Hungarian male sabre fencers
Olympic fencers of Hungary
Fencers at the 1900 Summer Olympics
Austro-Hungarian military personnel killed in World War I